A eunuch is a man who has been castrated.

Eunuch or Eunuchs may also refer to:

Eunuch (TV series), a 1980 Hong Kong TV series
Eunuch (film), a 1986 South Korean film
The Eunuch, a 1971 Hong Kong film directed by Teddy Yip
Eunuchs (film), a 2007 British documentary
Eunuchus, a comedy by the 2nd century BCE Roman playwright Terence

See also
Eunice (disambiguation)
UNICE (disambiguation)
Unix (disambiguation)